Archischoenobius pallidalis is a moth in the family Crambidae. It was described by South in 1901. It is found in China (Hubei, Fujian, Guangxi, Sichuan, Yunnan).

References

Moths described in 1901
Schoenobiinae
Moths of Asia